Return to Grimpen Ward is the remix album by Mentallo & The Fixer, released on February 13, 2001 by Metropolis Records.

Reception

Tom Schulte of AllMusic gave Return to Grimpen Ward three out of five stars and called it "heavy, ominous beat music akin to Nine Inch Nails with a reach back to New Order" and "This gives their brand of industrial music a tough rock consciousness, especially in the drum programming." Industrial Reviews gave the album a negative review of two out of five stars and accused the remixes of not improving on and at times worsening the original compositions.

Track listing

Personnel
Adapted from the Return to Grimpen Ward liner notes.

Mentallo & The Fixer
 Dwayne Dassing (as The Fixer) – electronics, synthesizer, sampler
 Gary Dassing (as Mentallo) – vocals, synthesizer, sampler

Production and design
 Daryl Litts – design, illustrations
 Damon Shelton – cover art

Release history

References

External links 
 
 Return to Grimpen Ward at Bandcamp
 Return to Grimpen Ward at iTunes

2001 remix albums
Mentallo & The Fixer albums
Metropolis Records remix albums